The Wind and the Wheat is the title of a 1987 instrumental album by guitarist Phil Keaggy, released on Maranatha! Music's Colours imprint. The album won the 1988 GMA Dove Award for Instrumental Album of the Year. It was remastered and re-issued in 2013.

Track listing
All songs were written by Phil Keaggy, unless otherwise noted.

Side one
 "March of the Clouds"  – 5:25
 "Paradise Dream"  – 5:32
 "The Wind and the Wheat"  – 4:32
 "Where Travellers Meet"  – 6:32
 "From Shore to Shore"  – 3:02

Side two
 "Prayer"  – 4:21
 "The Mission"  – 4:58
 "The Promise"  – 4:30
 "The Reunion"  – 6:00
 "I Love You Lord" (Laurie Klein)  – 5:28

Personnel 

 Phil Keaggy – arrangements, acoustic guitar (1-5, 7-10), electric guitar (1-4, 6, 7, 8, 10), bass (4, 5, 8), electric mini-guitar (5), keyboards (5), percussion (5)
 Jeff Lams – keyboards (1, 3, 8), arrangements (1), acoustic piano (4), synthesizer (4, 6)
 Harlan Rogers – Fender Rhodes (2), arrangements (2, 6), acoustic piano (6)
 Smitty Price – synthesizer (2, 6)
 Cheri Anderson – synthesizer (7)
 Dave Coy – bass (1, 2, 6), fretless bass (1, 3)
 Alex Acuña – drums (1, 3), percussion (1, 3, 6, 8)
 Ron Tutt – drums (2, 6)
 Dave Spurr – drums (8)
 Alex MacDougall – percussion (3, 4)

Production notes 

 Tom Coomes – executive producer, producer, audio engineer, mixing engineer
 Phil Keaggy – producer, audio engineer, mixing engineer
 Jeff Lams – producer, audio engineer
 Jim Scheffler – audio engineer, mixing engineer
 Eddie Keaggy – audio engineer
 Chris Taylor – audio engineer, mixing engineer
 Jim Scheffler – mixing engineer
 Bruce Botnick – CD mastering engineer 
 Digital Magnetics – CD mastering location
 Phil Fewsmith – album photography

References 

1987 albums
Instrumental albums
Phil Keaggy albums